Luis Bermejo Prieto (born 1969) is a Spanish actor and theatre director.

Biography 
Luis Bermejo Prieto was born in Madrid in 1969, son to parents from Zarza de Montánchez (province of Cáceres). He received his acting training at Cristina Rota's acting school. Active in stage plays since 1992, he eventually came to found his own theatre company, "Teatro del Zurdo". He made his debut in a feature film in Miguel Bardem's  (1999). He earned a nomination to the Goya Award for Best New Actor for his performance in Ángeles González Sinde's One Word from You. He has also featured in films such as Magical Girl and Your Son.

His television credits include performances in Periodistas, Compañeros, Policías, 7 vidas, El comisario, High Seas, Nasdrovia and ANA. all in.

Accolades

References 

1969 births
21st-century Spanish male actors
Spanish male television actors
Spanish male stage actors
Spanish male film actors
Living people
Actors from Madrid